The Turkmen State Circus is the main arena circus of Ashgabat, capital of Turkmenistan. It has a seating capacity of 1,700 seats. Is administered by the Ministry of Culture and Broadcasting of Turkmenistan.

History 
The circus was built from 1979–1984. In 2001, President Saparmurat Niyazov abolished all circuses in the country. In 2008, the new President of Turkmenistan Gurbanguly Berdimuhamedov lifted the ban on circus. By presidential decree, the State Circus of Turkmenistan was established, operating in the Soviet era building constructed. Reconstruction of an old two-story building of the Turkmen State Circus was started in June 2008 by the Turkish company "EFOR". The cost of reconstruction was $17.9 million. In October 2009, the Turkmen State Circus was opened with the first presentation.

In 2010, an adjacent training school for circus arts was opened. In 2012, the circus performed their first foreign performance in Minsk. In 2013, the Turkmen State Circus won first place in the Circus Festival Idol in Moscow.

References

Links 
 Theatres and Cinema Centers

Buildings and structures in Ashgabat
Soviet culture
Turkmenistan culture
Circuses
Buildings and structures built in the Soviet Union
Theatres completed in 1984